Nadia Valentin (born 10 April 1987) is a Haitian former footballer who played as a midfielder. She has been a member of the Haiti women's national team.

Club career
Valentin has played for Valentina FC in Haiti.

International career
Valentin capped for Haiti at senior level during the 2010 Central American and Caribbean Games and the 2012 CONCACAF Women's Olympic Qualifying Tournament (including its qualification).

International goals
Scores and results list Haiti's goal tally first

References

1987 births
Living people
Haitian women's footballers
Women's association football midfielders
Haiti women's international footballers